Adherbal may refer to:

Adherbal (admiral), Carthaginian admiral during the First Punic War
Adherbal (governor), governor of Gades during the Second Punic War
Adherbal (king of Numidia), reigned 118 to 112 BC
Adherbal roy de Numidie, a 17th-century play by French dramatist François Joseph Lagrange-Chancel